Simon Lepper is a British pianist specialising in song accompaniment and chamber music

Biography 

Born in Canterbury, Lepper read music at King's College, Cambridge, and studied piano accompaniment with Michael Dussek at the Royal Academy of Music.

Whilst a student, he won many awards for piano accompaniment including the Gerald Moore Award as well as the accompanist prizes in the Kathleen Ferrier and Royal Overseas League competitions. He is an Associate of the Royal Academy of Music and is professor of Collaborative Piano at the Royal College of Music, London. He is the official accompanist for the Cardiff BBC Cardiff Singer of the World Song Prize. 
Some of the singers he has enjoyed recital partnerships with included Dame Felicity Palmer, Stéphane Degout, Sally Matthews, Karen Cargill, Angelika Kirchschlager, Mark Padmore, Christopher Purves, Nicky Spence, Christiane Karg, Ilker Arcayürek, Benjamin Appl, Soraya Mafi, Stephan Loges, Nicole Cabell, Gillian Keith. He also works with German violinist Carolin Widmann. Their recording of Xenakis, Feldmann, Schoenberg and Zimmerman for ECM records received a Diapason d'or.

Discography 
  Schubert songs with Ilker Arcayurek Der Einsame  Champs Hill Records 2017
The songs of Ronald Corp (with Mark Stone - baritone), Stone Records (2010)
Phantasy of Spring (with Carolin Widmann - violin), ECM
Warlock Songs (with Andrew Kennedy - tenor), Landor Records
Debussy Early Songs (with Gillian Keith - soprano), Deux-Elles
Garland for Presteigne (with Gillian Keith - soprano), Metronome
Light and Water the music of Rhian Samuel (with Lucy Crowe - soprano and Gemma Rosefield - cello), Deux-Elles
Morgen (with Maria Radner - contralto), Rosenblatt Recitals

References 

 ECM records
 Champs Hill Records
 
 Simon Lepper Stone Records

British classical pianists
Male classical pianists
Living people
Accompanists
21st-century classical pianists
Year of birth missing (living people)
21st-century British male musicians